Local elections took place in various parts of the United Kingdom on 1 May 2003, the same day as the Scottish Parliamentary and the Welsh Assembly elections.  There were local elections for all councils in Scotland and in most of England.  There were no local elections in Wales, Northern Ireland or London.

The ruling Labour Party lost a considerable 833 seats, while both the main opposition parties, Conservative and Liberal Democrat, polled strongly, with the Conservatives enjoying the largest share of the vote. Labour had now been in government for six years and still had a triple-digit majority, and over the summer of 2003 some opinion polls showed the Tories level with Labour. However, these were to be the last of the two local council elections contested by the Tories under the leadership of Iain Duncan Smith, who was ousted as leader later in the year and succeeded by Michael Howard due to his unpopularity as leader and doubts about his ability to win a general election.

Fifty-nine councils held electoral pilot schemes to try to boost turnout figures.  Schemes included all postal voting, mobile polling stations, alterations to voting hours and various kinds of Electronic voting.  The most successful in raising turnout was all-postal voting which saw turnout rise to an average of 50%. In comparison, turnout across the whole of England was only 33%.

Summary of results
The Labour party lost a considerable 833 seats, losing control of councils such as Birmingham and Coventry, both of which the party had controlled for 20 years.

The Conservative party, who following the elections had the most councillors in the country (ahead of Labour by 601), extended its lead over the Labour party by 1,399 councillors. However, their celebrations were tempered by the resignation of Conservative front bencher Crispin Blunt, who described the party leader, Iain Duncan Smith as a "handicap" and called for him to be replaced.

England

Metropolitan boroughs
All 36 English Metropolitan borough councils had one third of their seats up for election.

Unitary authorities

Whole council
In 27 English Unitary authorities the whole council was up for election.

‡ New ward boundaries

Third of council
In 13 English Unitary authorities one third of the council was up for election.

District councils

Whole council
In 150 English district authorities the whole council was up for election.

‡ New ward boundaries

Third of council
In 82 English district authorities one third of the council was up for election.

Scotland

All 32 Scottish unitary authorities held elections.  They were held at the same time as the 2003 Scottish Parliament election.

Notes

References

Vote 2003 BBC News
Local elections 2003. House of Commons Library Research Paper 03/44.
Voting Pilots in 2003
The Guardian 2003 election coverage

 
2003
Local elections